Helicoconchus is a microconchid genus that occurs in the Lower Permian of Texas. It forms small reef-like bodies of tubes branching from a common origin. The impunctate tubes are greatly elongated for microconchids and have occasional diaphragms with central pits. The tubes branch in two ways: budding from the tube wall and binary fission. They lived in shallow, normal marine environments.

References 

Protostome enigmatic taxa
Tentaculita
Permian animals of North America